This is a list of American Association stadiums used during the league's existence from 1902 to 1962 and 1969 to 1997. It does not include stadiums used by teams of the American Association (AA) in existence from 1882 to 1891, which was a major league.

There are 42 stadiums known to have been used by the league located among 26 municipalities. Of the stadiums with known opening dates, the oldest to have hosted AA games was Borchert Field (1888), home of the Milwaukee Brewers; the newest was Zephyr Field (1997), home of the New Orleans Zephyrs. The highest known seating capacity was 62,000 at Superdome, the New Orleans Pelicans home, though it was actually designed for football. The highest capacity of a stadium designed for baseball was 21,698 at Metropolitan Stadium, where the Minneapolis Millers played their home games. The stadium with the lowest known capacity was Central Athletic Park, home of the Columbus Senators, which seated only 3,000.

Stadiums

{|class="wikitable sortable plainrowheaders"
|-
! Name
! Team(s)
! Location
! State
! Opened
! Capacity
! class="unsortable" | Ref(s)
|-
! scope="row" | All Sports Stadium 
| Oklahoma City 89ers
| Oklahoma City
| Oklahoma
| 1961
| align="right" | 12,000
| 
|-
! scope="row" | Armory Park
| Toledo Mud Hens
| Toledo
| Ohio
| 1897
| align="right" | 6,900
| 
|-
! scope="row" | Association Park
| Kansas City Cowboys, Kansas City Blues
| Kansas City
| Missouri
| 1903
| align="right" | 10,000
| 
|-
! scope="row" | Borchert Field
| Milwaukee Brewers
| Milwaukee
| Wisconsin
| 1888
| align="right" | 13,000
| 
|-
! scope="row" | Bosse Field
| Evansville Triplets
| Evansville
| Indiana
| 1915
| align="right" | 5,300
| 
|-
! scope="row" | Busch Stadium
| Houston Buffs
| Houston
| Texas
| 1928
| align="right" | 11,717
| 
|-
! scope="row" | Cardinal Stadium 
| Louisville Colonels, Louisville Redbirds
| Louisville
| Kentucky
| 1957
| align="right" | 33,500
| 
|-
! scope="row" | Central Athletic Park
| Columbus Senators
| Columbus
| Ohio
| 1896
| align="right" | 3,000
| 
|-
! scope="row" | Downtown Ball Park
| St. Paul Apostles
| Saint Paul
| Minnesota
| 1903
| align="right" | 
| 
|-
! scope="row" | Eagles Stadium
| Dallas/Dallas-Fort Worth Rangers
| Dallas
| Texas
| 1924
| align="right" | 10,500
| 
|-
! scope="row" | Eclipse Park
| Louisville Colonels
| Louisville
| Kentucky
| 1902
| align="right" | 3,500
| 
|-
! scope="row" | Exposition Park
| Kansas City Blues
| Kansas City
| Missouri
| 
| align="right" | 4,000
| 
|-
! scope="row" | Herschel Greer Stadium 
| Nashville Sounds
| Nashville
| Tennessee
| 1978
| align="right" | 11,500
| 
|-
! scope="row" | Johnny Rosenblatt Stadium 
| Omaha Cardinals, Omaha Dodgers, Omaha Royals
| Omaha
| Nebraska
| 1948
| align="right" | 17,500
| 
|-
! scope="row" | LaGrave Field
| Fort Worth Cats, Dallas-Fort Worth Rangers
| Fort Worth
| Texas
| 1926
| align="right" | 12,000
| 
|-
! scope="row" | Lawrence–Dumont Stadium
| Wichita Braves, Wichita Aeros
| Wichita
| Kansas
| 1934
| align="right" | 8,500
| 
|-
! scope="row" | League Park II
| Cleveland Bearcats/Spiders
| Cleveland
| Ohio
| 1910
| align="right" | 21,000
| 
|-
! scope="row" | Lexington Park
| St. Paul Saints/Apostles
| Saint Paul
| Minnesota
| 1897
| align="right" | 10,000
| 
|-
! scope="row" | Privateer Park
| New Orleans Zephyrs
| New Orleans
| Louisiana
| 1979
| align="right" | 5,000
| 
|-
! scope="row" | Metropolitan Stadium
| Minneapolis Millers
| Bloomington
| Minnesota
| 1956
| align="right" | 21,698
| 
|-
! scope="row" | Midway Stadium
| St. Paul Saints
| Saint Paul
| Minnesota
| 1957
| align="right" | 13,050
| 
|-
! scope="row" | Mile High Stadium
| Denver Bears/Zephyrs
| Denver
| Colorado
| 1948
| align="right" | 19,000
| 
|-
! scope="row" | Minnehaha Driving Park
| Minneapolis Millers
| Minneapolis
| Minnesota
| 
| align="right" | 
| 
|-
! scope="row" | Municipal Stadium
| Kansas City Blues
| Kansas City
| Missouri
| 1923
| align="right" | 17,476
| 
|-
! scope="row" | Neil Park
| Columbus Senators, Columbus Red Birds
| Columbus
| Ohio
| 1905
| align="right" | 11,000
| 
|-
! scope="row" | Nicollet Park
| Minneapolis Millers
| Minneapolis
| Minnesota
| 1896
| align="right" | 10,000
| 
|-
! scope="row" | North AmeriCare Park 
| Buffalo Bisons
| Buffalo
| New York
| 1988
| align="right" | 19,500
| 
|-
! scope="row" | Owen J. Bush Stadium
| Indianapolis Indians
| Indianapolis
| Indiana
| 1931
| align="right" | 12,934
| 
|-
! scope="row" | Parkway Field
| Louisville Colonels
| Louisville
| Kentucky
| 1923
| align="right" | 13,496
| 
|-
! scope="row" | Principal Park 
| Iowa Cubs
| Des Moines
| Iowa
| 1992
| align="right" | 10,500
| 
|-
! scope="row" | Red Bird Stadium
| Columbus Red Birds
| Columbus
| Ohio
| 1932
| align="right" | 14,500
| 
|-
! scope="row" | Robin Roberts Stadium
| Springfield Redbirds
| Springfield
| Illinois
| 1925
| align="right" | 4,500
| 
|-
! scope="row" | Sec Taylor Stadium
| Iowa Oaks/Cubs
| Des Moines
| Iowa
| 1947
| align="right" | 8,000
| 
|-
! scope="row" | Superdome
| New Orleans Pelicans
| New Orleans
| Louisiana
| 1975
| align="right" | 62,000
| 
|-
! scope="row" | Swayne Field
| Toledo Mud Hens/Iron Men, Toledo Sox
| Toledo
| Ohio
| 1909
| align="right" | 12,000
| 
|-
! scope="row" | Oiler Park
| Tulsa Oilers
| Tulsa
| Oklahoma
| 1934
| align="right" | 7,200
| 
|-
! scope="row" | Victory Field 
| Indianapolis Indians
| Indianapolis
| Indiana
| 1996
| align="right" | 12,500
| 
|-
! scope="row" | War Memorial Stadium
| Buffalo Bisons
| Buffalo
| New York
| 1937
| align="right" | 45,000
| 
|-
! scope="row" | Washington Street Park (East)
| Indianapolis Indians
| Indianapolis
| Indiana
| 
| align="right" | 
| 
|-
! scope="row" | Washington Street Park (West)
| Indianapolis Indians
| Indianapolis
| Indiana
| 
| align="right" | 5,000
| 
|-
! scope="row" | Watt Powell Park
| Charleston Senators
| Charleston
| West Virginia
| 1948
| align="right" | 5,500
| 
|-
! scope="row" | Zephyr Field 
| New Orleans Zephyrs
| Metairie
| Louisiana
| 1997
| align="right" | 10,000
| 
|}

Notes

Map

See also

List of Triple-A baseball stadiums
List of International League stadiums
List of Pacific Coast League stadiums

References

External links

Digitalballparks.com's complete American Association ballpark history since 1903

American Association (1902–1997)
American Association (1902–1997) stadiums
Stadiums